Cavin Lobo (born 4 April 1988) is an Indian professional footballer who plays as an attacking midfielder for Indian Goa Professional League club Vasco.

Career

Early career
In 2010 Lobo was playing for Sporting Goa who were then in the I-League 2nd Division and the Goa football team in the Santosh Trophy. After a good performance for Goa in the Santosh Trophy, Lobo was signed by then reigning I-League champions Dempo for the 2010-11 season. Then in 2011, Lobo signed for another I-League side Mumbai. The midfielder scored twice in the campaign with his new club. He scored his first goal for the club on 22 December 2011 against HAL, in the 77th minute as Mumbai won 4–0. He then scored his second goal for Mumbai on 6 February 2012 in the 36th minute to help Mumbai to a surprise 2–1 victory.

East Bengal
For the 2012-13 season, Lobo signed for East Bengal. Lobo made his debut for East Bengal in the I-League on 30 December 2012 against Pailan Arrows, coming on as an 87th-minute substitute for Penn Orji in a match that East Bengal won 3–0.
On 8 May 2013, he scored his 1st goal of the season in a 6-0 win during a 2012-13 season match over United Sikkim.

Atlético de Kolkata (loan)
In the 2014 Indian Super League, Lobo was picked in the first round of domestic draft by Atletico de Kolkata. On 23 October 2014, he scored twice in the second half to inspire a 2-1 comeback against FC Goa in a home match and became the first Indian player to score 2 goals in a single ISL match.

Kerala Blasters (loan)
In July 2015 Lobo was drafted to play for Kerala Blasters FC in the 2015 Indian Super League.

ATK 
Lobo returned to ATK for the fifth season of ISL

International
Cavin Lobo made his debut for India on 12 March 2015 against Nepal, coming on as a substitute for Lenny Rodrigues and had an impressive outing, which included winning a penalty.
Cavin Lobo also has been called up as probable for the World Cup Qualifiers against Oman and Guam .

Career statistics

Club
Statistics as of 10 April 2020

References

Indian footballers
1988 births
Living people
Footballers from Goa
Calcutta Football League players
I-League players
Dempo SC players
Mumbai FC players
East Bengal Club players
Indian Super League players
ATK (football club) players
India international footballers
Association football forwards
Kerala Blasters FC draft picks
Kerala Blasters FC players
Sporting Clube de Goa players
Churchill Brothers FC Goa players
RoundGlass Punjab FC players